The Samsung Galaxy M31 is an Android smartphone manufactured by Samsung Electronics as part of the Galaxy M series. It was unveiled on 25 February 2020. Its key features include a 6.4 inch Super AMOLED display, a quad-camera setup and a 6000 mAh battery.

Specifications

Design 
The Samsung Galaxy M31 has a plastic unibody design with a glossy gradient finish. On the side frame; there is a power button and a volume rocker at the right, there is a SIM card/microSD card tray at the left, and there is a 3.5 mm headphone jack, a USB-C port, a microphone and a speaker at the bottom. The rear camera setup paired with an LED flash and the capacitive fingerprint reader are located at the back. 

The phone has a 6.4 inch Infinity-U display with a U-shaped notch for the front-facing camera and a sizable bottom bezel.

The phone measures 159.2 mm x 75.1 mm x 8.9 mm and weighs 191 grams. It is available in Ocean Blue, Space Black and Red.

Hardware
The Samsung Galaxy M31 has a 6.4 inch Super AMOLED display with 1080×2340 pixels resolution, 19.5:9 aspect ratio and ~403 ppi pixel density. It is powered by Exynos 9611 system-on-chip with an octa-core (4x2.3 GHz Cortex-A73 & 4x1.7 GHz Cortex-A53) CPU and ARM Mali-G72 MP3 GPU. It comes with either 6 GB or 8 GB RAM and 64 GB or 128 GB internal storage. It has a 6000 mAh non-removable lithium polymer (Li-Po) battery with 15 W fast charging.

Cameras
The Samsung Galaxy M31 has a quad-camera setup with a 64 MP main camera, an 8 MP wide-angle camera, a 5 MP macro camera and a 5 MP depth sensor. It also has a 32 MP front-facing camera. Both the front-facing camera and the main camera can record 4K video at 30 fps.

Software
The Samsung Galaxy M31 comes Android 10 with One UI 2.preinstalled. The phone also received One UI 2.1 and One UI 2.5 user interface updates before getting a Android version update. It was then revealed that the Samsung Galaxy M31 was eligible for Android 11 version update. On 19 January 2021, the phone started receiving Android 11 update with One UI 3 user interface. The phone then received an update for One UI 3.1 user interface in March 2021. In April 2022, the phone started receiving Android 12 version update with One UI 4.1 user interface.

See also 
Samsung Galaxy M30s
Samsung Galaxy M series
One UI

References 

Samsung smartphones
Mobile phones introduced in 2020
Samsung products